Tüfekçioğlu, Polatlı is a village in the District of Polatlı, Ankara Province, Turkey.  The village is populated by Kurds.

References

Villages in Polatlı District

Kurdish settlements in Ankara Province